Albertazzi is an Italian surname. Notable people with the surname include:

Emma Albertazzi (1814–1847), English opera singer
Giorgio Albertazzi (born 1923), Italian actor and film director
Michelangelo Albertazzi (born 1991), Italian footballer

Italian-language surnames
Patronymic surnames
Surnames from given names